Slacks is a common term for pants or trousers. It may also refer to:
Donovan Slacks, leader of a militant fishermen's uprising in 1920s Britain
Slacks Creek, Queensland, a suburb of Logan City, Queensland, Australia

See also
Slack (disambiguation)